William Douglas Weir, 1st Viscount Weir GCB PC (12 May 1877 – 2 July 1959) was a Scottish industrialist and politician, who served as President of the Air Council in 1918.

Early life
Weir was born in Glasgow in 1877, the eldest child of James Weir (1842/3–1920) and his wife, Mary Richmond (1848–1931). He attended Allan Glen's School and the High School of Glasgow before entering an apprenticeship in the business established by his father and his uncle, G. and J. Weir, manufacturers of condensers, pumps, and evaporators.

Industrialist
Weir rose to become a director of G. and J. Weir, before serving as managing director between 1902 and 1915, and as chairman from 1910 to 1953. During World War I, he converted his factories to produce explosive shells.

He went on to hold a number of other directorships, including Lloyds Bank (1928–38), Imperial Chemical Industries (1928–53), International Nickel (1928–59), and Shell Transport and Trading (1939). He was also chairman of the Anglo-Scottish Sugar Beet Corporation.

Public servant
David Lloyd George appointed him to the unpaid position of director of munitions in Scotland in July 1915, he joined the Air Board in December 1916 and was made a Knight Bachelor in February 1917. He joined the Air Council in November 1917 and became its President in April 1918, resigning in December that year after the end of the war. For his efforts he received the Distinguished Service Medal.  He was appointed to the Privy Council in April and was raised to the peerage as Baron Weir, of Eastwood in the County of Renfrew, in the summer.

He didn't desire any further political power, and went on to serve on a number of government committees, including those on civil aviation, economies in the fighting services, and co-ordination between the navy, army, and air force. During 1924 and 1925, Weir chaired the committee on electricity supply to plan the rationalisation of the United Kingdom's electrical power industry. His conclusions led to the Electricity (Supply) Act 1926, and the creation of the National Grid and the Central Electricity Board. He was appointed to the Order of the Bath as a Knight Grand Cross in 1934.

In 1935, he was a member defence policy and requirements committee and became advisor to Sir Philip Cunliffe-Lister, later Viscount Swinton upon his appointment as Secretary of State for Air. He was behind the creation of shadow aircraft factories and was an advisor on national defence, resigning his position after Swinton's dismissal. He was created Viscount Weir, of Eastwood in the County of Renfrew in 1938,

He was a founder and later president of the Royal Scottish Automobile Club and was elected to The Other Club in 1932.

Between 1939 and 1941 Weir served as the director-general of explosives at the Ministry of Supply and in 1942 he was chairman of the Tank Board.

Family life
William's younger brother James George Weir was involved in the family business and also in the Air Ministry. 
He married Alice Blanche MacConnachie (1882–1959), the daughter of John MacConnachie  on 2 June 1904. They had two sons and a daughter. Weir died on 2 July 1959 at his home at Giffnock, Renfrewshire, he was aged 82.

He was succeeded by James Kenneth Weir, 2nd Viscount Weir.

Honours
In addition to his knighthoods, barony and viscountcy, Weir received an honorary doctorate from the University of Glasgow in 1919, the freedom of the City of London in 1957, the Order of the Crown of Italy, and he became a Commander of the Légion d'honneur.

In 2011 he was one of seven inaugural inductees to the Scottish Engineering Hall of Fame.

Archives

 The Papers of William Douglas Weir, 1877-1959, 1st Viscount Weir of Eastwood held by the Archives of the University of Glasgow
 The Papers of 1st Viscount Weir held by Churchill Archives Centre

Footnotes 

  

1877 births
1959 deaths
Businesspeople from Glasgow
People educated at the High School of Glasgow
Engineers from Glasgow
Politicians from Glasgow
Knights Bachelor
Knights Grand Cross of the Order of the Bath
Commandeurs of the Légion d'honneur
People educated at Allan Glen's School
Deputy Lieutenants of Renfrewshire
20th-century Scottish businesspeople
Members of the Privy Council of the United Kingdom
Scottish Engineering Hall of Fame inductees
Barons created by George V
Viscounts created by George VI